The Lubbock Lazers were a soccer club based in Lubbock, Texas that competed in the SISL and USISL. For the 1991/92 indoor season, the team was named the Lubbock Tornado, but returned as the Lazers after that season.

Year-by-year

Defunct soccer clubs in Texas
Defunct indoor soccer clubs in the United States
USISL teams
1986 establishments in Texas
1993 disestablishments in Texas
Association football clubs established in 1986
Association football clubs disestablished in 1993
Sports in Lubbock, Texas